Apriona tigris is a species of beetle in the family Cerambycidae. It was described by Thomson in 1878.

References

Batocerini
Beetles described in 1878